The Hannover Scorpions are a professional ice hockey team, which plays in the Oberliga, Germany's third tier ice hockey league. They previously played in the Deutsche Eishockey Liga from 1996 to 2013.

History
Founded in 1975 as ESC Wedemark, the team was renamed Wedemark Scorpions in their first DEL season in 1996 after the rock band Scorpions, who also call Hanover, Lower Saxony their home. The next season, the Scorpions relocated to Hanover proper and began playing their home games at TUI Arena in 2000.

Despite playing in the region's top venue, as well as enjoying sizeable corporate and political support, the team has struggled to generate sustained interest in Hanover.

Before relocating there in 1997, the Scorpions played their home games in Mellendorf, a small town located 20 km north in Wedemark township. They were actually considered rivals of Hanover. Thus, many local fans resented their longtime foe taking over the Hanover market at the expense of the city's historic hockey team, the less-favored Indians, and refused to support the Scorpions. 

With the club stricken by financial problems at the conclusion of the 2012–13 season, the Scorpions were forced to sell their DEL license to 2nd Bundesliga club the SERC Wild Wings on June 14, 2013. The Scorpions were then placed in the Oberliga, Germany's third tier league.

Honors

Champions
DEL Championship (1): 2010
Champion 1.League (1): 1996
Oberliga Nord Champion (1): 1994
Regionalliga Nord Champion (2): 1977, 1991

Players

Honored members
10  Joe West
20  Len Soccio
85  Arthur Jamaev

Season records

References

External links

Official Team Website 

Deutsche Eishockey Liga teams
Sport in Hanover
Ice hockey teams in Germany
Ice hockey clubs established in 1975
1975 establishments in West Germany